Swayamvaram may refer to:

 Swayamvaram (1972 film), a Malayalam film directed by Adoor Gopalakrishnan
 Swayamvaram (1982 film), a Telugu film
 Swayamvaram (1999 film), a Telugu film directed by K. Vijaya Bhaskar
 Swayamvaram (play), part of the Krishnanattam dance drama